The longfin smelt (Spirinchus thaleichthys) is a smelt that is found in several estuaries and lakes along the northern Pacific coast of North America.

Its most distinctive characteristic is the long pectoral fins that reach nearly to the base of the pelvic fins, and thus inspire the common name. The sides are silver, with the back ranging from an olive to a pinkish shade. The upper jaw is long, reaching nearly to the posterior edge of the eye, and the lower jaw projects slightly in front of the upper jaw. Both jaws have a set of very small teeth. The lateral line is incomplete, reaching back only as far as the dorsal fin. Size is limited to about 20 cm.

Their principal food item is the opossum shrimp, Neomysis mercedis, and species of Acanthomysis, but they will also eat copepods and other small crustaceans. In turn, they are eaten by a variety of fishes, birds, and marine mammals; for instance, they are an important prey for the harbor seal, Phoca vitulina, in the Columbia River.

Their primary habitat is the open water of estuaries, where they can be found in both the saltwater and freshwater areas, typically in the middle or deeper parts of the water column. They have been found as far north as Prince William Sound in Alaska, also in Skagit Bay, Grays Harbor, Willapa Bay, lower Columbia River, Yaquina Bay, Coos Bay, Humboldt Bay, the Eel River estuary, Klamath River estuary, and San Francisco Bay. The longfin smelt have been primarily affected by import and export of water from these estuaries, resulting in high mortality rates. They have been collected from the mouth of the Russian River occasionally, and a single fish was once caught in Monterey Bay. In addition, there are landlocked populations in British Columbia's Harrison Lake, and the Lake Washington.

In 2020 it was discovered, from annual surveys of San Francisco Bay from 2011–2019, that a locally abundant population of longfin smelt spawns in the southernmost portion of the bay, in the marshes and sloughs capturing freshwater outflows from Coyote Creek in Santa Clara County, California. The recent conversion of salt ponds into the tidal marsh combined with low salinity, nutrient-rich effluent recycled water from the San Jose-Santa Clara Regional Wastewater Facility may be supporting an important previously unknown source population of longfin smelt.

Although once one of the most common species found in the San Francisco and Humboldt bays, even as late as the 1970s, they are now much less frequent in the smelt fishery. Given past abundance in the San Francisco Bay estuary, longfin smelt were likely historically an important forage fish, but have declined 99.9% from pre-1980's levels.

In 1992 the Natural Heritage Institute petitioned to list longfin smelts as an endangered species, but the petition was denied the following year, among the reasons being given was that the decline was not observed elsewhere. The reasons for decline are not known; Peter Moyle suggests estuary outflow reduction, entrainment is connection with the pumping of water out of the Delta area, climatic variations, water pollution, and the impact of introduced species as possibilities.

As of 2012, the longfin smelt has been added to the list of candidates for potential protection under the Endangered Species Act. It will be monitored annually and assessed against higher priority species. The California Department of Fish and Wildlife found only three longfin smelt in their Fall Midwater Trawl Annual Fish Abundance Summary conducted in fall of 2015. This is the lowest amount of recorded longfin smelt in the history of Fall Midwater Trawl Surveys.

References

 
 Peter B. Moyle, Inland Fishes of California (University of California Press, 2002), pp. 234–239
 Damon, L. and J. DuBois, Memorandum: 2015 SKT Delta Smelt Index, California Department of Fish and Wildlife, December 18, 2015. 
 U.S. Fish and Wildlife Survey, Longfin Smelt 12 Month Finding, Last Updated: December 19, 2015.  
 
 Rosenfield, J. and D. Baxter, "Population Dynamics and Distribution Patterns of Longfin Smelt in the San Francisco Estuary".Transactions of the American Fisheries Society, 2007,136:6, 1577-1592

longfin smelt
Western North American coastal fauna
Fauna of Western Canada
Fish of the Western United States
longfin smelt
Taxa named by William Orville Ayres